Robert Beauvais (6 March 1911 – 23 February 1982) was a French writer and journalist. He was married twice, to Gisèle Parry and Ginette Garcin. From his first marriage he had a daughter, Élisabeth Beauvais, a musician known as Clothilde. Among his friends were Guy des Cars, Jacques Rueff, Maurice Boitel, and Françoise Sagan. Some of his works were later adapted by Jean Yanne.  Beauvais is buried in the village of Audresselles.

Works

Theatre
Peau neuve
Les Derniers Outrages

Humorous works
Histoire de France et de s'amuser (illustrations de Jacques Chaval) (1964)
Quand les Chinois (1966)
L'Hexagonal tel qu'on le parle (1970)
Pigeon vote (1971)
Le Français kiskose (1975)
Nous serons tous des Protestants (1976)
Le Demi-juif (1977)
Les Tartuffes de l'écologie (1978)
Mythologie (1979)

External links

1911 births
1982 deaths
Writers from Paris
20th-century French dramatists and playwrights
French humorists
20th-century French male writers
French male non-fiction writers
20th-century French journalists